Fernand Canteloube (3 August 1900 – 16 July 1976) was a French cyclist who competed in the road race at the 1920 Summer Olympics. He won a team gold and an individual bronze  medal. He finished fourth at the 1921 UCI Road World Championships.

References

1900 births
1976 deaths
French male cyclists
Olympic cyclists of France
Cyclists at the 1920 Summer Olympics
Olympic gold medalists for France
Olympic bronze medalists for France
Olympic medalists in cycling
Sportspeople from Aubervilliers
Medalists at the 1920 Summer Olympics
Cyclists from Île-de-France